The Rural Community Advancement Program is a program established by the 1996 farm bill (P.L. 104-127, Sec. 761) under which USDA is authorized to provide state rural development block grants, direct and guaranteed loans, and other assistance to meet rural development needs across the country. Program funding is allocated to three accounts: (1) community facilities, (2) rural utilities, and (3) rural business and cooperative development.

See also

Rural Development Trust Fund (7 U.S.C. 2009).

References 

Federal Agriculture Improvement and Reform Act of 1996
United States Department of Agriculture